The Sri Lanka Rifle Corps (SLRC) is a (reserve) regiment of the  Sri Lanka Army. It is made up of two volunteer (reserve) battalions. It has been formed with personnel from the central highlands and the many plantations in the Central Province of Sri Lanka. It is the only regiment of the Sri Lanka Army that recruits its personnel from a particular geographical area.

History
The origins of the Rifle Corps can be traced back to the colonial era when the British planters in the central highlands of Ceylon formed a volunteer regiment called the Ceylon Planters Rifle Corps in 1887 which was attached to the Ceylon Defence Force. This regiment was disbanded when the Ceylon Army was formed in 1949.

In the 1980s the management of the many plantations called for the recreation of a volunteer Rifle Corps in the highlands. Due to these requests two battalions were raised in Pallekele and Neuchatel Estate Neboda on 15 February 1985  by Brigadier G. R. Jayasinghe, assisted by Lt-Colonel Wettasinghe and Captain P. Abeyratne. The first commanding Officers were Lieutenant Colonel (later General) Ranjan Wijeratne (2nd Battalion) who was the Chairman of the State Plantations Corporation and Lieutenant Colonel P.R Seneviratne (1st Battalion) who was the Chairman of the Janatha Estate Development Board.

These two battalions have deployed in the Northern and Eastern Provinces due to the Civil War. Currently, the regiment is deployed in the Central Province provides security to the vital sectors of dams and hydroelectric projects of the Mahaweli Development programme. A detachment is maintained by the regiment in Kandy for the protection of the Temple of the Tooth.

Units
1st Battalion, Sri Lanka Rifle Corps (Formed on 10 December 1984)
2nd Battalion, Sri Lanka Rifle Corps (Formed on 15 February 2006)

Notable members
General Ranjan Wijeratne - Former Minister of  Foreign Affairs & Minister of State for Defence.
Major Surendra Lal Wijewardene - Former Adjutant of the SLRC
Lt col Lakshman Ratnaweere, (SLRC) - Board 4 and 5 chairman JEDB

Order of precedence

See also
Sri Lanka Army
Ceylon Planters Rifle Corps

External links
 Sri Lanka Army
 Sri Lanka Rifle Corps
 ranjanwijeratnefoundation.org

Military units and formations established in 1984
Rifle Corps
Rifle Corps
R